The following is a list of the 151 communes of the Vaucluse department of France.

The communes cooperate in the following intercommunalities (as of 2022):
Métropole d'Aix-Marseille-Provence (partly)
Communauté d'agglomération du Grand Avignon (partly)
Communauté d'agglomération Luberon Monts de Vaucluse
Communauté d'agglomération des Sorgues du Comtat
Communauté d'agglomération Ventoux-Comtat Venaissin
Communauté de communes Aygues Ouvèze en Provence
Communauté de communes Enclave des Papes-Pays de Grignan (partly)
Communauté de communes Pays d'Apt-Luberon (partly)
Communauté de communes du Pays Réuni d'Orange
Communauté de communes du Pays des Sorgues et des Monts de Vaucluse
Communauté de communes Rhône Lez Provence
Communauté de communes Territoriale Sud-Luberon
Communauté de communes Vaison Ventoux (partly)
Communauté de communes Ventoux Sud (partly)

References

Vaucluse